Woody Guthrie Sings Folk Songs is a remastered compilation album of American folk songs sung by legend Woody Guthrie accompanied by Lead Belly, Cisco Houston, Sonny Terry, and Bess Lomax Hawes originally recorded for Moses Asch in the 1940s and re-released in 1989 by Folkways Records.

Track listing
Hard Traveling
What Did the Deep Sea Say?
The House of the Rising Sun
900 Miles (Instrumental)
John Henry
Oregon Trail
We Shall Be Free
Dirty Overalls (My Dirty Overhauls)
Jackhammer John
Springfield Mountain
Brown Eyes
Boll Weevil Blues (Boll Weevil)
Guitar Blues (Instrumental)
Will You Miss Me?

1989 compilation albums
Woody Guthrie albums
Folkways Records albums